Orient Paper Mill is a paper and paper crafts manufacturer in Amlai (Madhya Pradesh), India. It has been associated with paper manufacture in Africa. The mill is part of Orient Paper & Industries which comprises the paper facility and manufacturers of Portland cement and ceiling fans, and which itself is a subsidiary of CK Birla Group.

Orient has worked with Pan African Paper Mills in Kenya, in partnership with the Government of Kenya and the International Finance Corporation.

The Orient Paper Mill was awarded the Golden Peacock Environment Management Award for 2006 by the World Environment Foundation (WEF).

See also
CK Birla Group

Sources

External links
"Orient Paper Mills". Orient Paper & Industries. Retrieved 2018-10-25.

CK Birla Group
Shahdol
Pulp and paper companies of India
Companies based in Madhya Pradesh
Manufacturing companies established in 1939
Indian companies established in 1939
Renewable resource companies established in 1939